Evgenia "Genya" Chernyshova (sometimes romanized Chernisheva) is a former pair skater who competed for the Soviet Union. With Dmitri Sukhanov, she won gold at the 1989 World Junior Championships, after taking silver a year earlier. They were coached by Natalia Pavlova in Saint Petersburg.

After retiring from competition, Chernyshova moved to the United States and became a skating coach in Utah. She is the former coach of 2010 and 2011 U.S. novice champion, Nathan Chen.

Competitive highlights 
(with Sukhanov)

References

Navigation 

Soviet female pair skaters
Living people
World Junior Figure Skating Championships medalists
Universiade medalists in figure skating
Year of birth missing (living people)
Universiade silver medalists for the Soviet Union
Competitors at the 1991 Winter Universiade